The Sydney Inner Metropolitan may refer to any one of Australia's oldest and most established areas:

Sydney central business district 
City of Sydney, the Sydney central business district and surrounding inner city suburbs
Lower North Shore (Sydney) region
Eastern Suburbs (Sydney) region
Inner West region